"Next in Line" is a song written and originally recorded by Johnny Cash.

The song was recorded by Cash in April 1957 and released as a single on Sun Records (Sun 266) later in the year, with "Don't Make Me Go" (another song from the same recording session) on the opposite side. The single reached #9 on the Billboard C&W Best Sellers in Stores chart. The song "Next in Line" (on its own) also reached #99 on the Top 100 and the top ten on the Most Played C&W by Jockeys chart.

Composition 
It is a melancholy love song, as is the song it was coupled with on the single.

References 

Johnny Cash songs
1957 songs
1957 singles
Songs written by Johnny Cash
Sun Records singles